Deubiquitinating protein VCIP135 is a protein that in humans is encoded by the VCPIP1 gene.

References

Further reading